Adriano Cristofali (27 March 1717, in Verona – 1788) was a Veronese architect, whose style bridged between Enlightenment-Baroque architecture and Neoclassicism.

Life
The son of a gardener to Marchese Giambattista Spolverini, Cristofali studied under Count Alessandro Pompei, an architectural theorist and learned his trade in the humanistic atmosphere fostered by Marchese Scipione Maffei. Despite his humble parentage he worked as an architect, assessor, surveyor and hydraulic engineer and in training a whole generation of younger architects in his studio, including two of his sons and Luigi Trezza.

His works in Verona include the Palazzo Sambonifacio Tedeschi (built 1750, now the Hotel Accademia), the Palazzo Balladoro (in front of palazzo Canossa) and the Palazzo Salvi (Headquarters of the Accademia di Agricoltura Scienze e Lettere), as well as the portico for the Teatro Filarmonico of Verona, completed by Ettore Fagiuoli the following century. Also notable are his plans for the Villa Bettoni at Gargnano on the shores of Lake Garda; for the Villa Mosconi Bertani; for the Villa Bertani at Novare di Arbizzano; for the Villa Canossa at Grezzano; and for the Villa Vecelli Cavriani di Mozzecane.

Sources
http://villavecellicavriani.it/
https://web.archive.org/web/20110722040426/http://www.ketchup.it/regione/eventi/evento.asp?rg=ven&regione=veneto&prov=belluno&idev=536

1717 births
1788 deaths
Architects from Verona
18th-century Italian architects
Italian neoclassical architects
Italian Baroque architects